This is a list of civil parishes in the ceremonial county of East Sussex, England. There are 105 civil parishes.

Population figures are unavaialable for some of the smallest parishes and those created after 2011.

The districts of Eastbourne, Hastings and most of Brighton and Hove are unparished. This corresponds to the former districts of Eastbourne County Borough, Hastings County Borough, Hove Municipal Borough, Portslade by Sea Urban District and part of the former Brighton County Borough.

See also

 List of civil parishes in England

References

External links
 Office for National Statistics : Geographical Area Listings

Civil parishes
East Sussex